Jumaat Ibrahim (born 28 October 1938) is a Malaysian boxer. He competed in the men's flyweight event at the 1964 Summer Olympics. At the 1964 Summer Olympics in Tokyo, he lost by knockout to Sulley Shittu of Ghana.

References

External links
 

1938 births
Living people
Malaysian male boxers
Olympic boxers of Malaysia
Boxers at the 1964 Summer Olympics
Place of birth missing (living people)
Flyweight boxers